Digital III at Montreux is a 1979 live album featuring a compilation of performances by Ella Fitzgerald, Count Basie, Niels-Henning Ørsted Pedersen, Joe Pass, and Ray Brown, recorded at the 1979 Montreux Jazz Festival. It was produced and has liner notes by Norman Granz. The cover photo is by Phil Stern.

This is one of four albums featuring Fitzgerald at the Montreux Jazz Festival and is Fitzgerald's third Montreux appearance to be released on record. The remainder of Fitzgerald's Montreux performance of this year was released on the 1979 album A Perfect Match.

Ella's performance on this album won her the 1982 Grammy Award for Best Jazz Vocal Performance, Female.

Track listing
 "I Can't Get Started" (Vernon Duke, Ira Gershwin) – 3:47
 "Good Mileage" (Dennis Wilson) – 7:17
 "I Don't Stand a Ghost of a Chance with You" (Bing Crosby, Ned Washington, Victor Young) – 3:16
 "Flying Home" (Benny Goodman, Lionel Hampton, Sydney Robin) – 8:05
 "I Cover the Waterfront" (Johnny Green, Edward Heyman) – 3:49
 "Lil' Darlin'" (Neal Hefti) – 4:41
 "In Your Own Sweet Way" (Dave Brubeck) – 7:01
 "Oleo" (Sonny Rollins) – 4:51

Personnel
Recorded July 12, 1979, in Montreux, Switzerland:

 Tracks 1-2

The Count Basie Orchestra
 Count Basie - piano
 Danny Turner - alto sax
 Bobby Plater - alto sax
 Eric Dixon - tenor sax
 Kenny Hing - tenor sax
 Charlie Fowlkes - baritone saxophone
 Ray Brown - trumpet
 Pete Minger - trumpet
 Sonny Cohn - trumpet
 Paul Cohen - trumpet
 Mitchell 'Booty' Wood - trombone
 Bill Hughes - trombone
 Mel Wanzo - trombone
 Dennis Wilson - trombone
 Freddie Green - guitar
 John Clayton - double bass
 Butch Miles - drums
 Tracks 3-4
 Ella Fitzgerald - vocals
 Paul Smith - piano
 Freddie Green - guitar
 Keter Betts - double bass
 Micky Roker - drums
 Tracks 5-6
 Joe Pass - guitar
 Tracks 7-8
 Joe Pass - guitar
 Niels-Henning Ørsted Pedersen - double bass

References

1979 live albums
Albums produced by Norman Granz
Albums recorded at the Montreux Jazz Festival
Collaborative albums
Count Basie Orchestra live albums
Ella Fitzgerald live albums
Grammy Award for Best Jazz Vocal Performance, Female
Joe Pass live albums
Pablo Records live albums